Semmering may refer to:

 Semmering (ski resort)
 Semmering, Austria
 Semmering Pass
 Semmering railway